The Annie Award for Best Animated Feature – Independent is an Annie Award introduced in 2015, awarded annually.

Recognition
The category was created to recognize full-length films that do not get a wide release in the United States, such as the work of independent animators and international studios.

Winners and nominees

2010s

2020s

Multiple wins and nominations by studio

See also
 Academy Award for Best Animated Feature
 Golden Globe Award for Best Animated Feature Film
 Annie Award for Best Animated Feature
 Producers Guild of America Award for Best Animated Motion Picture
 BAFTA Award for Best Animated Film
 European Film Award for Best Animated Feature Film

References

External links
 

Annie Awards
Awards for best animated feature film
Awards established in 2015
2015 establishments in the United States
Independent films